Cabrillo Unified School District is a school district in California.  It consists of Half Moon Bay High School, Pilarcitos High School/alternative education, Cunha Intermediate School, Farallone View Elementary School, Alvin S. Hatch Elementary School, Kings Mountain Elementary School, and El Granada Elementary School. In total, it serves close to 4,400 students .

References

External links

 

School districts in San Mateo County, California